James M. Baley Jr. (1912–2003) was an American lawyer and judge. A Republican, he served in the North Carolina House of Representatives, representing Madison County, in the General Assemblies of 1937-38 and 1939-40. He served as United States Attorney for the Western District of North Carolina under President Dwight D. Eisenhower from 1953 through 1961. Baley then returned to the practice of law at the firm that became McGuire, Wood & Bissette, until his appointment to the North Carolina Court of Appeals in 1973. After a brief stint on the Court of Appeals, he was appointed to a special superior court judgeship.

Baley also served as chairman of the North Carolina Republican Party in the early 1950s and as a presidential elector for the Bush/Quayle ticket in 1988.

References

External links

|-

1912 births
2003 deaths
Republican Party members of the North Carolina House of Representatives
United States Attorneys for the Western District of North Carolina
North Carolina Court of Appeals judges
1988 United States presidential electors
People from Madison County, North Carolina
20th-century American judges